The 1926 Estonian Football Championship was the sixth top-division football league season in Estonia. Nine teams, seven from Tallinn and one from Pärnu, Narva took part in the league. It was played as a knock-out tournament. Tallinna Jalgpalliklubi won the championship for the third time in four years.

Preliminary round

Quarter-finals

Semi-finals

Final

Top goalscorers 
 Eduard Ellman-Eelma (Tallinna Jalgpalliklubi) - 6 goals
 Arnold Pihlak (Tallinna Jalgpalliklubi) - 6 goals

References

Estonian Football Championship
1